Zhao Qizheng (born January 1940) is a retired Chinese engineer and politician. Previously he served as director of the State Council Information Office and director of the Foreign Affairs Committee of the National Committee of the Chinese People's Political Consultative Conference. He was a member of the 16th Central Committee of the Communist Party of China. He was a member of 10th National Committee of the Chinese People's Political Consultative Conference and a member of the 11th Standing Committee of the Chinese People's Political Consultative Conference.

Biography
Zhao was born in Beijing in January 1940, while his ancestral home is in Zunhua, Hebei. His parents were professors of physics at Nankai University. He elementary studied at Tianjin Experimental Middle School and secondary studied at Tianjin Nankai High School. In September 1958, he was accepted to the University of Science and Technology of China, where he majored in nuclear physics.

After graduating in 1963, he was despatched to the Second Research and Design Institute, Ministry of Nuclear Industry, as a technician. In January 1975, he was transferred to Shanghai Broadcast Equipment Factory, a factory under the jurisdiction of Ministry of Aerospace Industry, where he eventually was deputy director in December 1982.

He got involved in politics in May 1984, when he was appointed deputy party chief of CPC Shanghai Industrial Working Committee. In November 1984 he became deputy head of the Organization Department of CPC Shanghai Municipal Committee, rising to the head position in August 1986. Two months later, he was admitted to member of the standing committee of the Shanghai Party committee, the city's top authority. He was vice mayor of Shanghai in June 1991, and held that office until January 1998. During his term in office, he was responsible for foreign affairs and foreign trade. He participated in the establishment the Pudong New Area of which he himself served as its first party chief and governor.

In January 1998, he was transferred to Beijing and took office as deputy director of the State Council Information Office, three months later, he rose to become director. He was responsible for explaining national policy and social development of China to the media tinct through international cultural exchange. Due to his excellent performance, he was known as "public relations manager of the Chinese government". He served in the post until his retirement in August 2005.

In September 2006, he was hired as a doctoral supervisor and dean of the School of Journalism, Renmin University of China, he remained at the university until 2008.

In March 2008, he was elected a member of the 11th Standing Committee of the Chinese People's Political Consultative Conference, and became director of its Foreign Affairs Committee. In June 2008, he was employed as a doctoral supervisor and dean of the Binhai Research Institute of Nankai University. In April 2009, he was proposed as vice president of China Economic and Social Council.

Works

References

External links
Biography of Zhao Qizheng on china.org.cn

1940 births
Living people
University of Science and Technology of China alumni
People's Republic of China politicians from Beijing
Chinese Communist Party politicians from Beijing
Members of the 16th Central Committee of the Chinese Communist Party
Members of the Standing Committee of the 11th Chinese People's Political Consultative Conference
Members of the 10th Chinese People's Political Consultative Conference